Võ Minh Trí (Cần Giuộc, April 3, 1972) is a retired Vietnamese football referee who had been a full international referee for FIFA.

He was chosen as the V-League Referee of the Year in 2010. He was officiated at the 2010 AFF Suzuki Cup, 2014 FIFA World Cup qualification, 2015 SAFF Championship.

To date, he is the only high profile Vietnamese referee to have officiated in several international competitions.

References

External links 
 Profile

Living people
1972 births
Vietnamese football referees
People from Long An Province